"You Used to Love Me" is the debut single by American singer-songwriter Faith Evans from her debut album Faith. Released as a single on July 13, 1995, it peaked at number 24 on the Billboard Hot 100 chart and was certified gold by the RIAA.

Produced by Sean "Diddy" Combs and Chucky Thompson, the song was featured in The Notorious B.I.G. biopic Notorious (2009), when Faith Evans's character finds Biggie with another woman in a hotel. It was also featured in the 2008 film The Wackness.

Track listing
US CD Maxi single
"You Used to Love Me" (Album Version) – 4:28
"You Used to Love Me" (Club I Mix) – 4:15
"You Used to Love Me" (Club II Mix) – 5:08

UK CD Maxi single
"You Used to Love Me" (Album Version) – 4:28
"You Used to Love Me" (Ali Mix) – 4:28
"You Used to Love Me" (Puff Daddy Mix) – 4:33
"You Used to Love Me" (Club 1 Mix) – 4:15

Notes
"Ali Mix" produced by Ali Shaheed Muhammad, Keyboards: D'Angelo"Puff Daddy Mix" produced by Sean "Puffy" Combs

Credits
Executive production – Sean "Puffy" Combs
Lyrics – Faith Evans
Mixing – Sean "Puffy" Combs, Tony Maserati
Production – Chucky Thompson and Sean "Puffy" Combs

Charts

Weekly charts

Year-end charts

Certifications

References

1995 singles
1995 songs
Bad Boy Records singles
Faith Evans songs
Songs written by Faith Evans